Tillandsia spiralipetala is a plant species in the genus Tillandsia. This species is native to Bolivia and Ecuador.

References

spiralipetala
Flora of Bolivia
Flora of Ecuador